Mount Williams is located on the border of Alberta and British Columbia on the Continental Divide. It was named in 1918 after Major General Arthur Victor Seymour Williams CMG.

See also
 List of peaks on the Alberta–British Columbia border

References

Two-thousanders of Alberta
Two-thousanders of British Columbia
Canadian Rockies